John Barran may refer to:
Sir John Barran, 1st Baronet (1821–1905)
Sir John Barran, 2nd Baronet (1872–1952)
Sir John Leighton Barran, 3rd Baronet (1904–1974) of the Barran baronets
Sir John Napoleon Ruthven Barran, 4th Baronet (1934–2010) of the Barran baronets
Sir John Ruthven Barran, 5th Baronet (b. 1971) of the Barran baronets
John Robert Nicholson Barran (b. 2008), heir of the Barran baronets

See also
Barran (surname)